The men's 5000 metres competition at the 1998 Asian Games in Bangkok, Thailand was held on 19 December at the Thammasat Stadium.

Schedule
All times are Indochina Time (UTC+07:00)

Results
Legend
DNF — Did not finish

References

External links
Results (archived)

Men's 05000 metres
1998